Tetzel  is a surname. Notable people with the surname include:

 Johann Tetzel ( 1465–1519), German Dominican preacher during the Protestant Reformation
 Joan Tetzel (1921–1977), American actress

See also
 Tezel